Riders of the Frontier, also known as Ridin' the Frontier, is a 1939 American Western film directed by Spencer Gordon Bennet and starring Tex Ritter and Jack Rutherford. It is a remake of the 1936 film The Cattle Thief.

Plot

Cast
 Tex Ritter as Tex Lowry/Ed Carter  
 White Flash as Tex's Horse  
 Jack Rutherford as Bart Lane 
 Hal Taliaferro as Henchman Buck  
 Olin Francis as Henchman Sam  
 Nolan Willis as Henchman Gus  
 Roy Barcroft as Outlaw Ed Carter 
 Merrill McCormick as Henchman Boney  
 Mantan Moreland as Chappie, the Cook  
 Bruce Mitchell as Marshal Bob  
 Jean Joyce as Martha Williams  
 Marin Sais as Sarah Burton  
 Maxine Leslie as Goldie 
 Edward Cecil as Dr. Dolson
 Bob Card as Henchman  
 Jack Evans as Henchman 
 Chick Hannan as Murdered Deputy  
 Jack Hendricks as Henchman  
 Jack King as Deputy  
 Clyde McClary as Deputy  
 Tex Palmer as Henchman

References

Bibliography
 Pitts, Michael R. Western Movies: A Guide to 5,105 Feature Films. McFarland, 2012.

External links
 

1939 films
1939 Western (genre) films
1930s English-language films
American Western (genre) films
Films directed by Spencer Gordon Bennet
Monogram Pictures films
Remakes of American films
American black-and-white films
1930s American films